Xanthodaphne is a genus of sea snails, marine gastropod mollusks in the family Raphitomidae.

Species
Species within the genus Xanthodaphne include:
 Xanthodaphne agonia (Dall, 1890)
 Xanthodaphne araneosa (R. B. Watson, 1881)
 Xanthodaphne argeta (Dall, 1890)
 Xanthodaphne bougainvillensis Sysoev, 1988
 Xanthodaphne bruneri (Verrill, 1884)
 Xanthodaphne charcotiana Bouchet & Warén, 1980<
 Xanthodaphne cladara Sysoev, 1997
 † Xanthodaphne contarinii Petracci, Bongiardino, Della Bella & Tabanelli, 2019 
 Xanthodaphne dalmasi (Dautzenberg & Fischer, 1897)
 Xanthodaphne egregia (Dall, 1908)
 Xanthodaphne encella (Dall, 1908)
 Xanthodaphne heterogramma (Odhner, 1960)
 Xanthodaphne imparella (Dall, 1908)
 Xanthodaphne leptalea (Bush, 1893)
 Xanthodaphne levis Sysoev, 1988
 Xanthodaphne maldivica Sysoev, 1996
 Xanthodaphne maoria Dell, 1956
 Xanthodaphne membranacea (Watson, 1886)
 Xanthodaphne pachia (R. B. Watson, 1881)
 Xanthodaphne palauensis Sysoev, 1988
 Xanthodaphne pastorinoi Kantor, Harasewych & Puillandre, 2016
 † Xanthodaphne pederzanii Tabanelli & Bongiardino, 2018
 Xanthodaphne pichi Figueira & Absalão, 2012
 Xanthodaphne pompholyx (Dall, 1889)
 Xanthodaphne pyriformis (Schepman, 1913)
 Xanthodaphne pyrropelex (Barnard, 1963)
 Xanthodaphne raineri (Engl, 2008)
 Xanthodaphne sedillina (Dall, 1908)
 Xanthodaphne sofia (Dall, 1889) 
 Xanthodaphne subrosea (Barnard, 1963)
 Xanthodaphne suffusa (Dall, 1890)
 Xanthodaphne tenuistriata Sysoev, 1988
 Xanthodaphne translucida (Watson, 1881) 
 Xanthodaphne tropica Sysoev & Ivanov, 1985
 Xanthodaphne xanthias (Watson, 1886)
Species brought into synonymy
 Xanthodaphne folini Locard, 1897: synonym of Xanthodaphne leptalea (Bush, 1893)

References

 Powell A.W.B. (1942). The New Zealand Recent and fossil Mollusca of the family Turridae with general notes on turrid nomenclature and systematics. Bulletin of the Auckland Institute and Museum. 2: 1-188, 14 pls.
 Sysoev, A. V., and D. L. Ivanov. "Nex Taxa of the Family Turridae (Gastropoda, Toxoglossa) from the Naska-ridge (Southeast Pacific)." Zoologichesky Zhurnal 64.2 (1985): 194-205.

External links
 Kantor Y.I., Harasewych M.G. & Puillandre N. (2016). A critical review of Antarctic Conoidea (Neogastropoda). Molluscan Research. 36(3): 153-206
 Bouchet, P.; Kantor, Y. I.; Sysoev, A.; Puillandre, N. (2011). A new operational classification of the Conoidea (Gastropoda). Journal of Molluscan Studies. 77(3): 273-308
 Worldwide Mollusc Species Data Base: Raphitomidae
 

 
Raphitomidae
Gastropod genera